The 1940 Rocky Mountain Conference football season was the season of college football played by the five member schools of the Rocky Mountain Conference (RMC) as part of the 1940 college football season.

The Colorado College Tigers, led by head coach Clark DeGroot, won the RMC championship with a 5–2–1 record (2–0–1 against conference opponents). End Tom Pelican and halfback Don Heizer received first-team honors on the All-Rocky Mountain Conference team.

The Colorado Mines Orediggers, led by John Mason, finished in second place with a 3–4 record (3–1 against RMC opponents). The conference championship was decided on October 19 when the Orediggers lost to Colorado College, 28-21, at Washburn Field in Colorado Springs. Four Colorado Mines players, including quarterback Joe Berta, received first-team honors on the 1940 All-Rocky Mountain Conference football team.

Conference overview

Teams

Colorado College

The 1940 Colorado College Tigers football team represented Colorado College of Colorado Springs, Colorado. In their first and only season under head coach Clark DeGroot, the Tigers compiled a 5–2–1 record (2–0–1 against RMC opponents) and won the RMC championship. The team played its home games at Washburn Field in Colorado Springs.

End Tom Pelican and halfback Don Heizer received first-team honors on the All-Rocky Mountain Conference team. Despite his size (five feet, six inches, and 156 pounds), Heizer was rated highly by opposing coaches "for his driving ball carrying, his pass catching and his general defensive play."

Colorado Mines

The 1940 Colorado Mines Orediggers football team represented the Colorado School of Mines of Golden, Colorado. In their fourth season under head coach John Mason, the Orediggers compiled a 3–4 record (3–1 against RMC opponents) and finished in second place in the RMC. The team played its home games at Campbell Field in Golden.

Four Colorado Mines players received first-team honors from the Associated Press on the 1940 All-Rocky Mountain Conference football team. They were: quarterback Joe Berta; end Louis DeGoes; tackle Dick Moe; and center Glen Hutchinson.

Montana State

The 1940 Montana State Bobcats football team represented Montana State College (later renamed Montana State University) of Bozeman, Montana. In their 11th season under head coach Schubert R. Dyche, the Bobcats compiled a 4–4 record.

Colorado State–Greeley

The 1940 Colorado State–Greeley Bears football team represented Colorado State College at Greeley, Colorado (now known as the University of Northern Colorado). Led by head coach John W. Hancock, the Bears compiled a 2–5–1 record (1–3 against RMC opponents) and finished in fourth place in the RMC.

Halfback Sam Sears and fullback Horace Brelsford, both juniors, were selected by the Associated Press as first-team players on the 1940 All-Rocky Mountain Conference team.

The team played its home games at Jackson Field in Greeley, Colorado.

Western State

The 1940 Western State Mountaineers football team represented Western State College of Colorado at Gunnison, Colorado (now known as the Western Colorado University). In their sixth year under head coach Paul Wright, the Mountaineers compiled a 2–6–1 record (0–3–1 against RMC opponents) and finished in fifth place in the RMC.

All-conference team
The Associated Press selected the following players as first-team honorees on the all-conference team.

 Quarterback - Joe Berta, Colorado Mines
 Halfbacks - Don Heizer, Colorado College; Sam Sears, Greeley
 Fullback - Horace Brelsford, Greeley
 Ends - Louis DeGoes, Colorado Mines; Tom Pelican, Colorado College
 Tackles - Dick Moe, Colorado Mines; Jack Burke, Montana State
 Guards - Rudy Aganski, Western State; Newell Berg, Montana State
 Center - Glen Hutchinson, Colorado Mines.

References